Woolard is a surname. Notable people with the surname include:

Caroline Woolard (born 1984), American artist
Cathy Woolard (born 1957), American politician
Collier Woolard (born 1968), United States Virgin Islands swimmer
Daniel Woolard (born 1984), American soccer player
Edgar S. Woolard Jr. (born 1934), American businessman
Edgar W. Woolard (1899–1978), American meteorologist
Harrell Woolard (born 1963), United States Virgin Islands swimmer
Jamal Woolard (born 1975), American actor and rapper
Kathryn Woolard (born 1950), American anthropologist
Larry D. Woolard (born 1941), American politician